Robert Bendick (February 8, 1917 - June 22, 2008) was the producer of the Today Show between the years of 1953-1955, and 1958-1960. Robert Bendick attended New York University, and the C.H. White school of Photography. Learning to use a camera Bendick worked for National Geographic and Time magazines. Eventually hired onto CBS in 1941 and one of the original three cameramen. Ultimately working his way up to producer, he produced the Today Show, and other major televised shows for both NBC and CBS during what is coined the golden years of television. One of Bendick's most famous productions come from a series called Wide Wide World, a documentary series that aired on NBC Sunday afternoons at 4 pm. Wide Wide World was a documentary series that aired for one hour, and was filmed in different parts of the world. This was the only show of its kind at the time. His production consisted of "Sunday Driver," "Land of Plenty," "and "Two Ways to Winter."

Bendick's works also consist of the produced coverage for both film and television of the 1962 America's Cup sailing races, opening night at the New York World's Fair (1962), The 17th annual Emmy Awards show (1965), and the 1964 Republican Convention.

References 

"Robert Bendick, 91, Early Producer of 'Today Show' - The New York Sun."The New York Sun. N.p., n.d. Web. 24 July 2012. <http://www.nysun.com/obituaries/robert-bendick-91-early-producer-of-today-show/81675/>.

"University of Oregon Archives." Guide to Robert Bendicks Papers. N.p., n.d. Web. 18 July 2012. <nwda-db.wsulibs.wsu.edu/findaid/ark:/80444/xv74908>.

Hilmes, Michele. The television history book. London: British Film Institute, 2003. Print.

Bendick, Jeanne, and Robert Bendick. Television works like this. 4th ed. New York: McGraw-Hill, 1965. Print

Kovarik, Bill. Revolutions in communication: media history from Gutenberg to the digital age. New York: Continuum, 2011. Print.

Bendick, Jeanne, and Robert Bendick. Making the movies,. New York: Whittlesey House, McGraw-Hill Book Company, 1945. Print.

Americas Cup Races. Production materials, Robert Bendick Papers, Ax 505, Box 1 Special Collections and University of Oregon Archives, Uo Libraries

Wide Wide World. “Sunday Driver”. Production materials, Robert Bendick Papers, Ax 505, Box 1 Special Collections and University of Oregon Archives, Uo Libraries

Wide Wide World. “Sunday Driver”. Production Materials Robert Bendick Papers, Ax 505, Box 1 Special Collections and University of Oregon Archives, Uo Libraries

“Today in Rome.” Production Materials, Robert Bendick Papers, Ax 505, Box 1 Special Collections and University of Oregon Archives, Uo Libraries

Wide Wide World, “Land of Plenty”. Production Materials, Robert Bendick Papers, Ax 505, Box 1 Special Collections and University of Oregon Archives, Uo Libraries

17th annual emmy awards, Robert Bendick Papers, Ax 505, Box 1 Special Collections and University of Oregon Archives, Uo Libraries

1917 births
2008 deaths